The Grasshopper Women's Masters (formerly the Zurich Women's Masters) was an annual women's World Curling Tour event held at the Grasshopper Curling Club in Zurich, Switzerland. The inaugural event was held in 2007.

Champions

Former World Curling Tour events
 
Sport in Zürich